Tempo is an EP from the Turkish girl group Hepsi official EP who worked with "Turkish Pop Queen" Sezen Aksu. It was released in August 2006 by Pepsi.

Music video

The music video features all the group members, however features Sezen Aksu as a Cartoon.
The video premiered in August 2006.
The single peaked at No. 4 in Turkey Top 20. It is in association with Pepsi, and worked with Turkish Pop legend Sezen Aksu, famous for working with Tarkan.

Track listing

 "Tempo" 
 "Kaç Yıl Geçti Aradan" (cover)
 "Tempo" (Deep-Tech Mix) 
 "Kaç Yıl Geçti Aradan (Electro Dub Mix)" (cover)
 "Tempo (Rio Mix)" 
 "Kaç Yıl Geçti Aradan (Deep House Mix)" (cover)

Hepsi songs
2006 singles